Bhanot is a subcaste of Punjabi Saraswat Brahmins in North India.There is a legend in Punjabi folks which hints the warrior heritage of Bhanot clan Brahmins.

Bhanots in ancient Punjab, ruled the region of present Bathinda and had very close knits with the bhatti and mohyal rulers of that time. Bhanot clan is member of Vatsa gotra (clan) which found in Bhrigu section of gotras.

A Rajput community also use the surname most of whom considered themselves an offshoot of Bhanot Brahmin lineage.

Presently Bhanot are part of Asthwan/Athawan sub group of Punjabi Brahmins which includes Joshi, Kural, Pathak, Bhardwaj, Sannd, Shourie and Bhanot. Alternative surnames of community are Bhanotra, Bhangotra. 

Notable people with the surname include:

Neerja Bhanot (1963–1986), Indian purser
Shaleen Bhanot (born 1983), Indian actor
Tarun Bhanot (born 1971), Indian politician
Major General Vinod Bhanot, Vir Chakra, Vishisht Seva Medal.
Anil Bhanot, British Hindu council leader.
Satakshi Bhanot, Indian beauty pageant.

Punjabi Brahmins
Hindu surnames
Punjabi tribes
Punjabi-language surnames
Indian surnames